A general election was held in Minneapolis on November 3, 2009. Minneapolis's mayor was up for election as well as all the seats on the City Council, the two elected seats on the Board of Estimate and Taxation, and all the seats on the Park and Recreation Board. This was the first election held in Minneapolis that used ranked choice voting, a collective term for instant-runoff voting and the single transferable vote.

Because city voters approved a city charter change by referendum in 2006 to use a ranked choice voting system, Minneapolis did not hold a primary election on September 8, the 2009 date for primaries in Minnesota.

There was a lawsuit in court to prevent the voting change; it lost by summary judgment in the first court, was appealed directly to the Minnesota Supreme Court, where it also lost. One person active in the lawsuit filed as a candidate but did not campaign; allegedly this was to give him legal standing to sue after the election.

Mayor

Incumbent Democratic–Farmer–Labor Mayor R. T. Rybak announced on January 13, 2009 that he would be running for re-election. 11 candidates were on the ballot.

Previously mentioned as possible candidates for Mayor were Bob Miller, the director of the Minneapolis Neighborhood Revitalization Program (NRP), Minneapolis City Council members Gary Schiff and Ralph Remington, Minneapolis Park Board President Tom Nordyke, former City Council president Jackie Cherryhomes, and Hennepin County Commissioner Peter McLaughlin; none of them ended up running.

City Council

All 13 seats on the Minneapolis City Council were up for election.

Board of Estimate and Taxation
The two elected members of the Board of Estimate and Taxation were up for election. Incumbent Carol Becker was re-elected in the first round with 52.1% of first-choice votes. As no other candidate achieved the threshold to be elected the second member, several rounds of vote transfers were necessary. David Wheeler was elected in the fifth round after the remaining candidates were defeated.

Members were elected citywide via the single transferable vote.

Party endorsements

Results

Park and Recreation Board
The nine members of the Park and Recreation Board were up for election. Three members were elected from one citywide, at-large district via the single transferable vote and six from single-member districts via instant-runoff voting.

Party endorsements

Results

At-large

District 1

District 2

District 3

District 4

District 5

District 6

References

2009 Minnesota elections
Local elections in Minnesota